Genar Andrinúa Cortabarría (born 9 May 1964) is a Spanish former professional footballer who played as a central defender.

Club career
Andrinúa was born in Bilbao, Biscay. During his career he played solely for Athletic Bilbao safe for a loan at Real Valladolid, and he made his debut for the former's first team in the 1983–84 season, appearing once for the La Liga champions.

Eventually, Andrinúa gained the captain's armband from veteran Andoni Goikoetxea, also a centre-back, and proceeded to play nearly 400 competitive games for the Basque club, also scoring at least once in all the seasons but one. After two weak last years he retired in June 1997 at the age of 33, with the side now captained by youngster Julen Guerrero.

International career
Andrinúa earned 28 caps and scored twice for the Spain national team. His debut came in a friendly with England on 18 February 1987 after coming on as a substitute for José Antonio Camacho in a 2–4 home loss (all four opponent goals by Gary Lineker), and he went on to be part of the squads at the UEFA Euro 1988 and the 1990 FIFA World Cup, retiring internationally after the latter tournament.

Andrinúa also played two times for the unofficial Basque Country side, and helped Spain under-21s win the 1986 European Championship.

International goals

Honours
Athletic Bilbao
La Liga: 1983–84
Copa del Rey: 1983–84

Spain U21
UEFA European Under-21 Championship: 1986

References

External links

1964 births
Living people
Spanish footballers
Footballers from Bilbao
Association football defenders
La Liga players
Segunda División players
Segunda División B players
Bilbao Athletic footballers
Athletic Bilbao footballers
Real Valladolid players
Spain under-21 international footballers
Spain under-23 international footballers
Spain international footballers
UEFA Euro 1988 players
1990 FIFA World Cup players
Basque Country international footballers